is a Japanese publishing company headquartered in Iidabashi, Chiyoda, Tokyo. It publishes textbooks about the English language, American literature, British literature, and other social science books, in addition to books about other subjects.

References

Book publishing companies in Tokyo
Textbook publishing companies